Manor (pronounced with a long "a") is an unincorporated community and census-designated place (CDP) in Ware County, Georgia, United States. It lies southwest of Waycross on U.S. Route 84. The community is part of the Waycross Micropolitan Statistical Area.

It is the former home of Ware Magnet, a Georgia School of Success. After a majority vote by school board members, the K-12 school was closed in May 2010 due to financial issues, despite its academic excellence.

It was first listed as a CDP in the 2020 census with a population of 94.

Geography 

Demographics

2020 census

Note: the US Census treats Hispanic/Latino as an ethnic category. This table excludes Latinos from the racial categories and assigns them to a separate category. Hispanics/Latinos can be of any race.

References

Census-designated places in Ware County, Georgia
Unincorporated communities in Ware County, Georgia
Waycross, Georgia micropolitan area